is a Japanese photographer. He is well-known for photographing the covers for John Lennon and Yoko Ono's albums, Double Fantasy and Milk and Honey. Before his marriage to Saori Minami in 1979, he took majority of the photographs for her album covers with CBS/Sony.

Life and work

Shinoyama graduated from Nihon University. He worked with the Light Publicity agency while still a student, and freelanced after graduation.

Shinoyama has put out a large number of books of photographs of girls, dressed, mostly undressed, and nude.

On November 10, 2009 Shinoyama's home and office were searched by police on suspicion of public indecency. The searches stemmed from concerns regarding nude photos he allegedly took in public of two women in August 2008 for his book 20XX TOKYO. On May 26, 2010 the court found Shinoyama guilty of public indecency and defiling a place of worship for photographing at Aoyama Cemetery. He was fined 300,000 Yen.

He is married to Saori Minami and their son is actor Akinobu Shinoyama.

Books

Books devoted to Shinoyama's works
This list is incomplete. 
  / Sir John Soane's Museum. Tokyo: Rokuyōsha, 1989. . Text by Arata Isozaki. A detailed study of Sir John Soane's Museum (London).
Santa Fe.  Tokyo: Asahi Shuppansha, 1991. . Rie Miyazawa, nude. (See Santa Fe.)
 The Painter's House: Balthus at the Grand Chalet. Te Neues, 2000. . Photographs of the extraordinarily large house of the Balthus family, and Balthus himself, his wife and their daughter.
Kissin' My Puppy. Tokyo: Rasukaru, 2005. . Japan's  and their dogs. The minimal text is in Japanese.
Shinoyama Kishin at Tokyo Disney Resort. Tokyo: Kodansha, 2008. . Commemorative collection of photographs taken at Tokyo Disney Resort theme park for its 25th Anniversary celebrations.

Other books showing Shinoyama's works
 Nihon nūdo meisakushū (Japanese nudes). Camera Mainichi bessatsu. Tokyo: Mainichi Shinbunsha, 1982.  Pp.24–25, 222–27 show nudes by Shinoyama.
Nihon shashin no tenkan: 1960 nendai no hyōgen / Innovation in Japanese Photography in the 1960s. Tokyo: Tokyo Metropolitan Museum of Photography, 1991.  Exhibition catalogue, text in Japanese and English. Pp.124–29 show nudes by Shinoyama.

Works

This list is incomplete. 

 Five Seasons / Matsuda Seiko (1987)
 Double Fantasy - cover photography of John Lennon and Yoko Ono
 Chemical Reaction - album cover photography of the band Vodka Collins
 135 Women
 The Geisha Series
 Accidents Series
 Tokyo Nude (1990) 
 SHINJUKU (1991) 
 Water Fruit/Kanako Higuchi (1991) 
 NY & NY/Yurie Nitani (1991)
 Santa Fe/Rie Miyazawa (1991) 
 TOKYO Future Century (1992) 
 Food (1992) 
 Balthus (1993) 
 News 1 Mystery of T House (1994)
 News 2 [Miwako] (1994)
 News 3 DrugStore (1994)
 News 4/Riona Hazuki (1994)
 Harue Miyamoto (1994)
 Hair (1994) 
 Adolescence revolution (1994)
 Blue Book / Aya Kokumai (1995)
 Anna Umemiya's Diary of Love/Anna Umemiya, Kenji Haga (1995)
 AKI MIZUSAWA PHOTOGRAPHY 1975-1995 (1995)
 Oozumou (1995)
 Yukio Mishima's House (1995)
 Hinano ga Pyon Pyon/Hinano Yoshikawa (1995)
 Mai Hosho (1995)
 one,two,three/Saki Takaoka (1996)
 Teihon sakka no shigotoba (1996)
 Tokyo secret meeting (1997)
 ERI ISHIDA 1979＋NOW (1997)
 Shinwa shōjo・Chiaki Kuriyama (1997)
 Shōjo-tachi no Okinawa (1997)
 Shōjokan (1997)
 Ningen Kankei (1997)
 Bora Bora/Chiaki Hara (1997)
 GEKISHA in HAWAII (1998)
 RIONA (1998)
 ELLIROSE (1998)
 Shashin wa sensōda! Genba kara no senkyō hōkoku (1998)
 Sugita kaoru joyū-gokko (1998)
 VLADIMIR MALAKHOV (1998)
 NARCISSISME (1998)
 West by South/Hijiri Kojima (1999)
 Shōjo no yokubō yoshino sayaka (1999)
 Man'no bijutsu (1999)
 HARUMI INOUE LIVE (1999)
 SIMON PYGMALIONISME (2000)
 NUEL LEGRIS OPERA DE PARIS (2000)
 Touch/Manno Art (2000)
 Ranman/Mai Oikawa (2000)
 DRIVE (2000)
 Idols (2000)
 THE PAINTER'S HOUSE (2001)
 The Kabuki (2001)
 MAIKO KAWAKAMI (2001)
 Hinanogachu~tsu?/Hinano Yoshikawa (2001)
 mye/Mye Kitajima (2001)
 KISHIN TAKARAZUKA GRAPH (2002)
 BACKSTAGE (2002)
 20XX TOKYO

Discography
Field recordings
 激写 Sounding Carib (1977)

Awards
  in 1966. 
  in 1980.
 Golden Eye Award in 1998.

References

External links

  
 Photography Now: three extremely brief exhibition notices.

1940 births
Living people
Japanese photographers
Portrait photographers
Japanese erotic photographers
People from Shinjuku
Nihon University alumni
Nude photography
Japanese contemporary artists
Tokyo College of Photography alumni